Paragon Park was an amusement park located on Nantasket Beach in Hull, Massachusetts.  It closed in 1984.

Rides
Among the amusement rides in operation during Paragon Park's history was a traditional-style Philadelphia Toboggan Company carousel (PTC #85) built in 1928 with hand-crafted horses, a bumper cars ride known as "Auto Scooters", a Ferris wheel, a horror-themed dark ride called "Kooky Kastle", and a wooden roller coaster known as The Giant Coaster.

There was also a ski lift-type ride called the Sky Lark, an automobile-themed ride known as "Turnpike Cars" (replaced by a different ride in the 1970s called the "Indy 500"), and a water ride called "Bermuda Triangle" (formerly the "Congo Cruise," the "Jungle Ride," the "Red Mill", and the "Mill Rapids"). More rides that Paragon hosted over the years were the Trabant, the Tilt-A-Whirl, Galaxy Coaster, the Skydiver, Paratrooper, Matterhorn, Himalaya, Round Up, Scrambler, Crazy Tea Cups, Twister Kiddie Coaster, Caterpillar, the Whip, Batman-slide, Super-slide, Salt and Pepper Shakers, Swing ride, Rotor, along with many rides that were smaller versions of these, geared towards children.

Other entertainment
Skeeball and pinball machines were favorite games at Paragon Park's penny arcade. Vendors along the boardwalk sold fried clams, salt water taffy made in a pulling machine visible to patrons, hot dogs and other food. There was a miniature golf course under the roller coaster. And in the mid-1960s, local radio station WBZ would sometimes have live broadcasts from Paragon Park. The deejays used a trailer, called the Sundeck Studio, which was outfitted with broadcasting equipment.

Today
Today, the only surviving remnant of Paragon Park on the boardwalk is the historic Paragon Park Carousel, which was moved from its original site. It is now located next to the old train station and clock tower. The rest of the site is devoted to condominium development. The Giant Coaster, built in 1917 and removed from the park in 1985, now operates as The Wild One at Six Flags America.

A small miniature golf course is located on one of the smaller sites that once housed a water slide and, previously, a few rides. The Dream Machine arcade is still in operation. The historic "Fascination" game room closed in 2019 due to storm damage. The remains of the "Turnpike Cars" roadway ride are hidden in overgrowth beside the parking lot, although are very much visible via Google Maps.

See also
List of amusement parks in New England
List of defunct amusement parks
Amusement ride

References

External links

Chris Haraden lecture - The History of Paragon Park
Paragon Park The Musical
Paragon Park Memories
Official Site of the Paragon Park Carousel
 http://spitpermit.com/?p=590
 Album cover art for the Neighborhoods, featuring the Comet roller coaster at Paragon Park
 Paragon Park, a collection of poems by Mark Doty
 Paragon Park TV ad

Buildings and structures in Plymouth County, Massachusetts
Defunct amusement parks in the United States
Hull, Massachusetts
Amusement parks in Massachusetts
1984 disestablishments in Massachusetts
Amusement parks closed in 1984